Lysis is the breaking down of the membrane of a cell. Lysis may also refer to:
 Lysis (dialogue), a dialogue of Plato about friendship (philia) 
 Lysis of Taras (  5th century BCE), Greek philosopher
 Lysis, one of the stages of the lytic cycle, one of the two cycles of viral reproduction
 Alkaline lysis, a method used in molecular biology to isolate plasmid DNA from bacteria

See also
 Lysias (disambiguation)